An ecclesiastical crime is a crime (delictum) related to the clergy where the crime is against canon law vis-à-vis civil law.

The crime of simony is the ecclesiastical crime of paying for offices or positions in the hierarchy of a church. The crimes of schism and heresy are also ecclesiastical crimes.

Older examples include "perjury", the breaking of a promissory oath (contractual promises made by oath or pledge of faith), and this was treated as an ecclesiastical crime. Some crimes have or have had both an ecclesiastical and a civil element to the crime; suicide and witches are counted here.

Financial and donation related
The term is also specifically used today for misappropriation of donation monies. In the International Bulletin of Missionary Research, January 2009, David B. Barrett, Todd M. Johnson, Peter F Crossing, in a study titled, "Christian World Communions: Five Overviews of Global Christianity, AD 1800–2025", show that "ecclesiastical crime" is growing at 5.77% per annum and in mid-2009 is estimated to be US$27 billion on a total "giving to Christian causes" of $410 Billion. Unchecked this crime will be valued at $65 Billion by 2025.

See also
 Ecclesiastical courts
 Ecclesiastical ordinances
 Ecclesiastical prison
 Canon law
 Sacrament of Penance

References

Crime
Catholic penal canon law